Anthony Kenneth Chisom Watson (born 26 February 1994) is an English professional rugby union player who plays wing or full-back for Leicester Tigers in Premiership Rugby and since 2014 has been a regular player for the  national team, starting the 2019 Rugby World Cup Final and winning over 50 caps.  Watson toured with the British & Irish Lions in 2017 and 2021, playing tests in both years.

Personal life
Watson attended St George's College, Weybridge in Surrey, where he was vice-captain of the rugby team.  His brother is former Wasps winger Marcus Watson.

Club career

In September 2011 Watson made his professional debut against Newcastle Falcons and became the youngest player to ever appear for London Irish in a Premiership match. He scored his first tries for the club in their victory over Stade Montois on 20 October 2012.

On 25 April 2013 it was announced that Watson would join Bath for the following season. In his first campaign at the club he scored a try in the final of the EPCR Challenge Cup as Bath finished runners up to Northampton Saints at Cardiff Arms Park. The next season saw Watson start in their Premiership final defeat to Saracens.

On 12 May 2022 Watson signed for Leicester Tigers. He made his debut for Leicester in a 51-18 loss to Saracens on 1 October 2022.

International career

England
Watson scored a try for the England U20 team as they defeated Ireland in the final round of the 2012 Six Nations Under 20s Championship to win the tournament. He was also a member of the side that retained the 2013 Six Nations Under 20s Championship. Later that year Watson was selected for the 2013 IRB Junior World Championship scoring a try in their semi-final victory over New Zealand and started in the final as England defeated Wales to become world junior champions for the first time.

At the age of nineteen, after a string of impressive performances for Bath at full-back, Watson was called into the senior England squad by coach Stuart Lancaster to train with them during their autumn international series in November 2013. In January 2014 he again trained with the squad during the 2014 Six Nations Championship and later that month scored a try for the England A team in a defeat against Ireland Wolfhounds.

Watson was included in the senior squad for their 2014 tour of New Zealand and scored a try on his England debut in a non-cap tour match against Crusaders. On 8 November 2014, Watson made his official test debut for England, from the bench, losing to New Zealand 21-24 as part of their 2014 Autumn Internationals.

Watson scored his first tries for England against Wales and France during the 2015 Six Nations. He was included in the squad for the 2015 Rugby World Cup and scored in warm-up fixtures against France  and Ireland. He was selected to start in all four of England's pool games at the tournament, scoring tries against Australia and Uruguay as the hosts failed to reach the knockout phase.

Watson was selected by new coach Eddie Jones for the 2016 Six Nations Championship and recorded tries against Ireland and Wales. He also scored in the final round as England beat France to achieve their first Grand Slam in over a decade. Later that year he scored a try against Wales and then started in all three victories on their 2016 tour of Australia. The following year saw Watson score a try in the penultimate round of the 2017 Six Nations against Scotland and then start in the final game of the competition as England missed out on a consecutive grand slam with defeat away to Ireland which also brought an end to a record equalling eighteen successive Test victories.

Watson was included in the squad for the 2019 Rugby World Cup and scored a try in a warm-up game against Italy at St James' Park. He scored the last try of the quarter-final against Australia and also played in the semi-final victory over New Zealand. He started in the final as England were defeated by South Africa to finish runners up.

Watson scored a try against Wales during the 2020 Six Nations and then started the final round victory in Italy which meant England won the tournament. Later that year he started in the final of the Autumn Nations Cup as England defeated France in extra time to win the competition. Watson scored tries against Italy and Wales during the 2021 Six Nations. Later in the tournament he scored a try against France on his fiftieth appearance for England.

British & Irish Lions
Watson was named as one of the 41 British & Irish Lions players that toured New Zealand in 2017. He started in all three tests as the series ended all square.

Watson was also selected by coach Warren Gatland for the 2021 Lions tour of South Africa. He started the first two tests; winning the first and losing the second. He was dropped for the final match which saw the Lions lose the series 2-1.

International tries

Honours
England
 Six Nations Championship: 2016, 2017, 2020
 Autumn Nations Cup: 2020
 Rugby World Cup runner-up: 2019

Bath
 Premiership runner up: 2014–15 
 EPCR Challenge Cup runner up: 2013–14

References

External links

 RFU profile
 Leicester Tigers profile

1994 births
Living people
Bath Rugby players
English rugby union players
Rugby union players from Surrey
Leicester Tigers players
London Irish players
People educated at St George's College, Weybridge
Rugby union fullbacks
Rugby union wings
England international rugby union players
British & Irish Lions rugby union players from England